Clear Paddock Creek is a tributary of Orphan School Creek, which in turn, is a tributary of Prospect Creek, located in the City of Fairfield, NSW. It flows north from Bonnyrigg, then turns its course north-east from Edensor Road, before emptying into Orphan School Creek in Wakeley. It is approximately 5 km in length.

References

See also
Orphan School Creek (Fairfield)
Green Valley Creek
Prospect Creek
Georges River

Creeks and canals of Sydney